Carla Oberholzer (née van der Merwe; born 14 January 1987) is a South African professional racing cyclist, who most recently rode for UCI Women's Continental Team . She rode in the women's road race at the 2016 UCI Road World Championships.

In June 2021, she qualified to represent South Africa at the 2020 Summer Olympics.

Major results

2014
 3rd BestMed Campus2Campus
 3rd Dome2Dome Cycle Challenge
 3rd BestMed Jock Cycle Classique
 3rd Action Ford Berge and Dale
 4th 947 Cycle Challenge
2015
 1st PPA Mangaung Cycle Tour
 1st Panorama Cycle Tour Mixed
 1st Druiwefees Kranskop Cycle Challenge
 2nd BestMed Satellite Road Classic
 2nd Action Ford Berge and Dale Classic
 3rd Value Logistics Fast One
 3rd Mayoral Cycle Race
 6th Road race, National Road Championships
 7th 947 Cycle Challenge
2016
 1st Druifewfees Kranskop Cycle Challenge
 1st Panorama 4 Day Cycle Challenge Mixed
 1st Wilro Lions Cycle Challenge
 1st Mogale Spring Classic
 1st Maluti Double 90 TTT
 2nd Rand Water Race for Victory
 2nd Bestmed Jock Cycle Classique
 3rd Queen Sibiya Classic
 3rd Berge and Dale Classic
 3rd Value Logistics Fast One
 4th Road race, National Road Championships
 4th 947 Cycle Challenge
2017
 1st Amashova Cycle Classic
 1st Bestmed Satellite Classic Road Race
 1st Bestmed Jock Cycle 3-day Tour
 1st Cansa Lost City Road Race
 1st Maluti Double 90 TTT
 1st Value Logistics Fast One
 6th Time trial, African Road Championships
 6th Road race, National Road Championships
2018
 1st  Road race, National Road Championships
 1st 947 Cycle Challenge
 1st Amashova Cycle Classic
 1st Berge & Dale
 1st Dischem Ride For Sight
 1st Vulintaba Classic
 1st Kremetart
 1st Medi Help Trap Net
 1st Jock Cycle Classic
 1st Lowveld Air Relax Tour
 1st Tshwane Classic
2019
 1st  Team time trial, African Games
 1st 947 Ride JHB
 1st Amashova Cycle Classic
 1st Berge & Dale
 1st Jock Cycle Classic
 1st Kremetart
 1st Maluti Double 90 TTT
 1st Panorama Tour
 3rd  Team time trial, African Road Championships
 5th Road race, National Road Championships
2020
 National Road Championships
2nd Road race
2nd Time trial
1st 947 Cycle Challenge
1st Fast One Cycle Challenge
2021
 African Road Championships
1st  Road Race
1st  Time trial
1st  Team time trial
1st  Mixed team relay
 National Road Championships
2nd  Road race
2nd  Time trial
1st Gauteng Provincial Championship | Road Race 
1st Sleepy River Cycle race 
2022
 National Road Championships
1st  Time trial
3rd  Road race

References

External links
 

1987 births
Living people
South African female cyclists
Place of birth missing (living people)
Competitors at the 2019 African Games
African Games medalists in cycling
African Games gold medalists for South Africa
Olympic cyclists of South Africa
Cyclists at the 2020 Summer Olympics
Sportspeople from Bloemfontein
White South African people